Tell It to My Heart is the debut studio album by American singer-songwriter Taylor Dayne, released on January 19, 1988, by Arista Records. Four singles were released and all of them reached the top 10 of the US Billboard Hot 100: the title track (number 7), "Prove Your Love" (number 7), "I'll Always Love You" (number 3), and "Don't Rush Me" (number 2), with the first two reaching the top 10 of the UK Singles Chart at numbers 3 and 8, respectively. The album has been certified double platinum by the Recording Industry Association of America (RIAA), denoting shipments in excess of two million copies in the United States.

Background
Two covers were issued for the album. The original version was photographed by Gilles Larrain and was very colorful, with Dayne resembling her appearance in the "Tell It to My Heart" music video, sporting big hair and outlandish makeup while wearing a tight black dress. The subsequent cover (which first appeared on the cover art for the single "Don't Rush Me") was photographed by Jennifer Baumann and was more subdued, showing Dayne in much more modest hair and makeup, seated against a wall while wearing a brown leather jacket and white tank top. It is likely that Arista Records reworked the album cover art to help cash in on Dayne's new-found success on the less youth-oriented Adult Contemporary chart after the release of "I'll Always Love You".

Critical reception
Andrew Panos from Number One remarked Dayne's "belting, soaraway voice" on the album.

Track listing
"Tell It to My Heart" (Seth Swirsky, Ernie Gold) – 3:41
"In the Darkness" (Billy Steinberg, Tom Kelly) – 3:17
"Don't Rush Me" (Alexandra Forbes, Jeff Franzel) – 3:48
"I'll Always Love You" (Jimmy George) – 4:31
"Prove Your Love" (Swirsky, Arnie Roman) – 3:26
"Do You Want It Right Now" (China Burton, Nick Straker) – 4:03
"Carry Your Heart" (Shelly Peiken) – 4:22
"Want Ads" (Gregg Perry, General Norman Johnson, Barney Perkins) – 3:00
"Where Does That Boy Hang Out" (David Lasley) – 4:23
"Upon the Journey's End" (Duet with Billy T. Scott) (J. Sciarrone) – 4:05

2015 remastered edition
"Tell It to My Heart" – 3:41
"In the Darkness" – 3:17
"Don't Rush Me" – 3:48
"I'll Always Love You" – 4:31
"Prove Your Love" – 3:26
"Do You Want It Right Now" – 4:03
"Carry Your Heart" – 4:22
"Want Ads" – 3:00
"Where Does That Boy Hang Out" – 4:23
"Upon the Journey's End" (Duet with Billy T. Scott) – 4:05

Disc one – 2015 bonus tracks
"Willpower" (from the 1988 Summer Olympics album, One Moment in Time) – 3:50
"Prove Your Love" (Hot Single Mix) – 3:25
"I'll Always Love You" (Single Mix) – 4:19
"Don't Rush Me" (Hot Single Mix) – 3:51
"Tell It to My Heart" (Percapella Mix) – 3:22
"Prove Your Love" (Edited Remix) – 5:10
"I'll Always Love You" (Extended Version) – 6:13
"Don't Rush Me" (Rushapella) – 3:39
"Tell It to My Heart" (Instrumental) – 3:41
"Don't Rush Me" (Bonus Beats) – 3:39

Disc two – 2015 bonus tracks
"Tell It to My Heart" (Club Mix) – 6:48
"Prove Your Love" (Extended Remix) – 7:28
"Don't Rush Me" (Extended Version) – 7:19
"Tell It to My Heart" (House of Hearts Mix) – 8:58
"Prove Your Love" (House Mix) – 7:28
"Don't Rush Me" (Continental Clubhouse Mix) – 8:42
"Tell It to My Heart" (Dub Mix) – 5:48
"Prove Your Love" (Prove Your Dub/Beats) – 8:39
"Don't Rush Me" (Dub Version) – 6:08
"Tell It to My Heart" (Dub of Hearts Mix) – 6:51
"Don't Rush Me" (Continental Dubhouse Mix) – 5:38

Personnel

Musicians
 Taylor Dayne – lead vocals, backing vocals
 Rich Tancredi – keyboards (1, 2, 5-10), drum programming, percussion, arrangements 
 Steve Skinner – keyboards (3, 4)
 Bob Cadway – guitars
 Donald Gladstone – bass
 Ric Wake – drum programming, percussion, arrangements
 Frank Dasaro – tom overdubs, cymbal overdubs
 Richie Cannata – saxophones
 Michael Gray – additional backing vocals 
 Shelly Peiken – additional backing vocals
 Billy T. Scott – additional backing vocals
 Casey Warner – additional backing vocals

Technical
 Ric Wake – producer, recording (1)
 Bob Cadway – recording, mixing (1, 3, 4, 7-10)
 Clay Hutchinson – additional vocal engineering
 John Herman – assistant engineer
 Dave O'Donnell – assistant engineer
 Don Rodenback – assistant engineer
 Mario Vasquez – assistant engineer
 Thomas R. Yezzi – assistant engineer
 Jason Corsaro – mixing (2, 6)
 Michael Hutchinson – mixing (5)
 Margery Greenspan – art direction
 Gilles Larrain – photography (original 1987 cover)
 Jennifer Baumann – photography (revamped 1988 cover)

Charts

Weekly charts

Year-end charts

Certifications

References

1988 debut albums
Albums produced by Ric Wake
Albums recorded at Sigma Sound Studios
Arista Records albums
Breakbeat albums
Taylor Dayne albums